Arikkadamukku  is a place in Thiruvananthapuram district, Kerala, India. It is connected with Trivandrum, Neyyattinkara, Vizhinjam, Poovar, Kattakkada, Nagarcoil, and Kanyakumari through the nearby National Highway 66.
Post Office available in arikkadamukku and Nemom railway station near Arikkadamukku
The pincode is 695020.

References 

Villages in Thiruvananthapuram district